Jhabua State was one of the princely states of India during the period of the British Raj. It  had its capital in Jhabua town. Most of the territory of the princely state was inhabited by the Bhil people, who constituted a majority of the population. The revenue of the state in 1901 was Rs.1,10,000.

History

The state of Jhabua was founded by Kesho Das or Kishan Das, in 1584. He was granted the title of Raja by Mughal Emperor Akbar as a reward for a successful campaign in Bengal, and for punishing the Bhil Chiefs of Jhabua Labana, who had murdered the wife and daughters of the Imperial Viceroy of Gujarat. Khushal Singh was the ruler of Jhabua in 1698, he gave much of his lands to his brothers and sons and was too weak to rule his state effectively. This allowed the Marathas to actively invade Jhabua on a regular basis. Raja Shiv Singh was an infant and therefore the states administration during this time was managed by the raja's mother and the nobles. The Marathas under Holkar took advantage of this situation to take control of Jhabua. The threat from Jai Singh of Sailana forced the nobles of Jhabua to rely on Maratha protection, Holkar thus sent his officers to manage the states affairs. Jhabua later came under British protection in 1817 A.D. and was under the Bhopawar Agency of the Central India Agency and in 1927 it became part of the Malwa Agency.There were 20 families of rank in the state who paid £1500 to the Holkars and £2500 to their own chief. In 1875 the state had a population of 55,000 and a revenue of £22,500. After India's independence in 1947, Jhabua's last ruler signed the accession to the Indian Union on 15 June 1948, and Jhabua became part of the newly created Madhya Bharat state, which in 1956 was merged into Madhya Pradesh.

Rulers
The rulers of Jhabua were Rathor Rajputs. They had the title of H.H. Raja Saheb. They  were granted a hereditary salute of 11 guns by the British.

Rajas

See also 
 Central India Agency
 Political integration of India

References

Princely states of Madhya Pradesh
Rajputs
Jhabua
Rathores
1584 establishments in India
1948 disestablishments in India